Saint-Calais-du-Désert is a commune in the Mayenne department in north-western France.

See also
Communes of Mayenne
Parc naturel régional Normandie-Maine

References

Saintcalaisdudesert